is a Japanese guitarist who is known for his work with Joe Lynn Turner.

Biography
Kajiyama's first commercial band was Precious which was formed by Mandrake Root Records in 1987 to promote him. The band dissolved after its only full-length album in 1991. Kajiyama became regarded as a guitar legend in the Japanese hard rock/heavy metal scene. As a result, he became acquainted with Joe Lynn Turner who guested on the album. After that, Turner invited him to appear on his album "Under Cover, Vol. 2". Since then Kajiyama occasionally took part in Turner's albums and Japan tours. Kajiyama and Morikawa formed Goldbrick in 2003.

Style
Kajiyama is influenced by artists such as Ritchie Blackmore, Yngwie Malmsteen, Al Di Meola, Laurie Wisefield. He is extremely precise at shredding with alternate picking, which was his style from Precious. However, Kajiyama denies he was ever a shredder. He says that the shredding style was requested by his record label, as Shrapnel Records also did at that time.

Discography

Precious
Crazy For Your Love (EP, 1987)
Blasting Your Head (EP, 1988)
To Glory We Steer (1991)
Early Days (demo tracks, 1996)
Secret Live (rehearsal tracks, 1999)

Niji Densetsu (1998, re-mastered in 2003)

With Joe Lynn Turner
Under Cover 2 (1999)
Holy Man (2000)
Slam (2001)
The Usual Suspects (2005)
Akira Kajiyama + Joe Lynn Turner - Fire Without Flame (2005)

With Hughes Turner Project
HTP (2002)
Live in Tokyo (2002)

Goldbrick
Goldbrick (2003)
Live! Groovy Nights 2003 (2003)
Goldbrick II (2004)
Max Body Groove -Goldbrick Live 2005- (2005)

With Takenori Shimoyama
Singer (2006)

External links
Official Akira Kajiyama Website

Living people
Musicians from Yamaguchi Prefecture
Japanese rock guitarists
Japanese heavy metal guitarists
Year of birth missing (living people)
20th-century Japanese guitarists
21st-century Japanese guitarists